Spy Song (1943–1973) was an American Thoroughbred racehorse. He was sired by 1934 American Champion Two-Year-Old Colt Balladier and out of two-time Champion filly, Mata Hari. He was bred at owner Charles Fisher's Dixiana Farm and raced under the colors of his Dixiana Stable.

Among his wins, Spy Song won the 1945 Arlington Futurity and ran second to Assault in the 1946 Kentucky Derby. He retired having won fifteen of thirty-six starts with earnings of $206,325.

References

1943 racehorse births
Racehorses bred in Kentucky
Racehorses trained in the United States
Thoroughbred family 2-o
Chefs-de-Race